Seven Times Down Eight Times Up is the third studio album by rapper eLZhi. It was released in 2020, four years after his sophomore effort, Lead Poison. The entire album was produced by JR Swiftz, and featured fellow Detroit-based artists Monica Blaire and Fes Roc as the only guests.

Rankings and ratings 

Seven Times Down Eight Times Up appeared in lists compiled by several reputed publications such as Hip Hop Golden Age and The Boston Globe.

Track listing 

 All tracks produced by JR Swiftz.

References 

2020 albums
Hip hop albums by American artists